Yaşaroğlu is a village in the Mazgirt District, Tunceli Province, Turkey. The village is populated by Kurds of the Izol tribe and had a population of 78 in 2021.

The hamlets of Bütünlü, Dalbahçe, Subaşı and Yaşar are attached to the village.

References 

Villages in Mazgirt District
Kurdish settlements in Tunceli Province